Scapegoat is the debut studio album by Japanese singer and songwriter Takuto. It was released on February 8, 2017, through the Being label.

Background
The album includes the three previously released singles "All Categorize", "Futari no Byoushin", and "Jinsei wa Meijoushi Katai".

The famous Vocaloid producer Neru was involved with the production of the album.

Scapegoat was released in two formats: a regular CD version (JBCZ-9050) and limited CD+DVD version. The DVD includes music videos (JBCZ-9049).

Charting performance
The album charted for one week at number 125 on the Oricon charts.

Track listing

In media
"All Categorize" – ending theme for anime television series Young Black Jack
"Futari Byoushin" – ending theme for anime television series Detective Conan
"Yume Oibito" – ending theme for the fourth season of anime television series Yamishibai
"Hyper Rookie" – opening theme for the NHK FM Broadcast radio program "Music Line"
"Climax" – ending theme for the Tokyo Broadcasting System Television program CDTV

References

2017 albums
Being Inc. albums
Japanese-language albums